Fort Napoléon (in French: Fort Napoléon des Saintes) is a fortification, located on Terre-de-Haut Island, in the Îles des Saintes, Guadeloupe.  Property of the Departmental Council of Guadeloupe, it has been classified as a historical monument since the December 15, 1997.

Fort Napoléon was built on the morne (Caribbean French word for "bluff") called Mire, it was originally named Fort Louis.  It was destroyed by British forces in 1809.  It was rebuilt in 1867, and named after Napoleon III, but never saw use in battle, and was instead used as a penitentiary. It has now been turned into a museum dedicated to the Saintes’ history, culture, and environment.  It also has contains the Jardin exotique du Fort Napoléon, a botanical garden dedicated to local succulent plants and iguanas.

History 
From 1759 to 1763, the English took possession of Saintes and part of mainland Guadeloupe. The archipelago was returned to the Kingdom of France upon signing of the Treaty of Paris on February 10, 1763.

The successor to a fear of the end of the 17th century, a fort was built between 1777 and 1779  on the dreary Mire to 119 m above sea level. This rectangular structure is protected by an earthen mortar masonry enclosure. It has barracks for 45 men and two tanks collecting rainwater. Its armament consists of two cannons and three mortars intended to protect the Whale Pass and the Terre-de-Haut roadstead.

After the Treaty of Paris of 1814 and the restitution of Guadeloupe in French jurisdiction, Fort Napoleon  was rebuilt on the ruins of the fort by erecting high surrounding walls and setting up a powder magazine. The works took place from 1816 to 1840. The Fortifications Committee of the Ministry of the Navy and Colonies in 1842 decided to build a real bastioned fortification, because of a system offering better defensive assets.

The Fort Napoleon was never used for military purposes. After retiring of disciplinary company and transferring garnisons in 1890, the Fort has closed.

See also 

 History of France
 French West Indies

References 

Forts in Overseas France
Local museums in France
History of Îles des Saintes
Buildings and structures in Îles des Saintes
Museums in Guadeloupe
Monuments historiques of Guadeloupe